The Macclesfield, Bollington and Marple Railway (MB&MR) was an  railway line between Macclesfield and Marple, England. The route was opened jointly by the Manchester, Sheffield and Lincolnshire Railway (MS&LR) and the North Staffordshire Railway (NSR) in 1869. It was part of an alternative link between Manchester and destinations south of Macclesfield.

The line closed in 1970 and its route now forms the Middlewood Way, a trail used by walkers, cyclists and horse riders.

History 

In 1840s and 1850s NSR was trying to find a route from Macclesfield to Manchester independent of the London and North Western Railway (L&NWR), which insisted on any NSR traffic going via Crewe, thus ensuring a higher L&NWR mileage and charges.

In 1863  a Macclesfield businessman, Thomas Oliver, promoted a scheme for a local line from Macclesfield  via Bollington to Marple where it would connect with the MS&LR. It was hoped the line would revive Bollington's cotton industry, carry the stone from quarries in Kerridge, and serve the collieries around Poynton.

The MS&LR seized on this scheme because the company needed another line from which to start a possible independent extension line to London. In 1864, Parliament authorised the creation of the railway. Both the MS&LR and NSR were empowered to subscribe £80,000 each for its construction, and for its operation and maintenance once open.

In response to such competition the L&NWR, which surprised by the success of the MB&MR's proposal, quickly came to an amicable traffic agreement with the NSR. This deal negated the original purpose and urgency of the line because the NSR now no longer needed an independent route to Manchester as it could use L&NWR lines.

Under these conditions, and with a general trade depression of the mid-1860s, construction of the new line was very slow. On 2 August 1869 a single-track line opened for passengers only. Goods traffic started on 1 March 1870. In 1871 the line was double-tracked along its entire length.
 
Initially there were five stations on the line:  Marple (Rose Hill), High Lane, Higher Poynton, Bollington and Macclesfield. In 1879 a new station was opened at Middlewood (later renamed Middlewood Higher).

In 1948, the line became part of the London Midland Region of British Railways). In 1960 Middlewood Higher closed. By the 1960s the line, like many others, it was considered to be a loss maker and was earmarked for closure under the Beeching cuts.

On 5 January 1970, the section between Rose Hill (Marple) and Macclesfield closed to all traffic. The track was lifted in early 1971. Only Rose Hill remained in operation due to the high number of passengers commuting to Manchester Piccadilly. It is now a terminus for a spur off the Hope Valley Line.

The stations at Higher Poynton and Bollington were demolished at around the same time. High Lane station remained derelict for seven years after closure until being demolished in 1977. Bollington station goods yard is now the site of the Clough Bank industrial estate.

Middlewood Way 
Since closure, the trackbed has been turned into a "linear park" between Macclesfield and Rose Hill, Marple. The long distance footpath was officially opened on 30 May 1985 by Dr David Bellamy. The platforms of Higher Poynton station are still extant and have been turned into a picnic sites on the trail. The trail crosses over a small valley of the River Dean at Bollington via a curved 23-arch stone viaduct. The viaduct was originally slated to be demolished but after protests it was saved to form part of the trail.

References 
 Railways of Marple and District From 1794

Further reading 
  - The Great Central and North Staffordshire Joint Railway

British joint railway companies
Closed railway lines in North West England
Pre-grouping British railway companies
Rail transport in Cheshire
Great Central Railway
Manchester, Sheffield and Lincolnshire Railway
North Staffordshire Railway
Railway lines opened in 1869
Railway lines closed in 1970
1869 establishments in England
1970 disestablishments in England
Railway companies established in 1869
British companies established in 1869